Cisco Brewers is a brewery, distillery, and winery on Nantucket Island in Massachusetts. It is the sole brewer on the island. It was established as a winery in 1981 and started making beer in 1995 and distilled spirits in 2000.

About

Nantucket Vineyard 
Nantucket Vineyard, a sister company of Cisco Brewers, was founded in 1981 by Dean and Melissa Long. After failing to grow grapes on Nantucket Island due to unsuitable climate and soil conditions, Dean and Melissa began to import grapes from California, Washington state and New York.

Cisco Brewers 
In 1992, Randy and Wendy Hudson moved into a loft above Dean and Melissa Long’s winery where they helped with production. Eventually, they began to producing beer on the site with the entire process taking place outside, with the exception of the cold-room. This outdoor brew space was referred to as a nano-brewery and was credited with being America’s only outdoor commercial brewery.

Growth 
In 1996, the Hudsons moved to a new building called the Mortan Building. But due to the construction, Cisco Brewers was unable to sell beer in July and August of 1996. This led to the creation of the company’s motto, “Nice beer, if you can get it”.

Triple Eight Distillery 
In 1997, Dean Long applied to the state of Massachusetts for a license to manufacture high-proofed spirits. The license was approved in the fall of 2000 and he began distilling single malt Notch Whiskey. However, the plan called for the whiskey to be aged for five years. So, to generate immediate income, the decision was made to also produce vodka because it could be sold right away. The name for the vodka, Triple Eight Distillery, came from the fact that it was produced with water from Nantucket well #888. To help raise capital for the production of the vodka, people were given the opportunity to purchase futures on barrels of Notch Whiskey.

Distribution 
In 2001, Cisco Brewers hired Matt Lambo to begin distributing Nantucket Vineyards, Cisco Brewers, and Triple Eight Distillery products. Lambo self-distributed the products in the greater Boston area. He opened over 200 accounts and currently heads public relations, promotions, and events as a Brand Manager for Triple Eight Distillery.

Cisco Brewery beer and its sister products are currently distributed in 12 states.

Partnerships

Cisco Brewers support the shark research activities of OCEARCH. As a result, a Great white shark tagged by OCEARCH in October, 2016 near Nantucket, Massachusetts was named "Cisco" after the brewery. The brewery also produces Shark Tracker Light Lager in support of OCEARCH.

References

External links
Company History
Official site
 Company History

Beer brewing companies based in Massachusetts